Winter A-Go-Go is a 1965 American comedy-drama film directed by Richard Benedict and starring James Stacy, William Wellman Jr., Beverly Adams, John Anthony Hayes, Jill Donohue, Tom Nardini, Duke Hobbie, Julie Parrish, Buck Holland, Linda Rogers, and Nancy Czar. The film was released by Columbia Pictures on October 28, 1965.

Plot
A teenage ski bum and his friend tries to turn the lodge he's inherited into a music club.

Cast
James Stacy as Danny Frazer
William Wellman Jr. as Jeff Forrester
Beverly Adams as Jo Ann Wallace
John Anthony Hayes as Burt
Bob Kanter as Roger
Jill Donohue as Janine
Tom Nardini as Frankie
Duke Hobbie as Bob
Julie Parrish as Dee Dee
Buck Holland as Will
Linda Rogers as Penny
Nancy Czar as Gloria 'Jonesy' Jones
Judy Parker as Dori
Walter Maslow as Jordan
Peter Brinkman as himself
H.T. Tsiang as Cholly
Carey Foster as Winter-A-Go-Go Girl
Arlene Charles as Winter-A-Go-Go Girl
Cheryl Hurley as Winter-A-Go-Go Girl
Cherie Foster as Winter-A-Go-Go Girl
Joni Lyman as herself

Production
Mike Frankovich of Columbia Pictures saw A Swingin' Summer (1965) and told producer Reno Carell he would distribute a follow up using that film's stars, James Stacy and William Wellman, Jr. The film was shot under the title A Swingin' Winter and used females under contract to Columbia. It was shot in Heavenly Valley on Lake Tahoe, and in the Eldorado National Forest.

Filming finished by early April 1965.

Release
The film was profitable for Columbia but not significantly so and the beach party cycle soon came to an end.

In August 1965 it was announced Stacy and Wellman would star in Fort Bikini for Carell but the film was not made.

References

Notes

External links

Winter a Go GO at TCMDB

1965 comedy-drama films
American comedy-drama films
1965 films
1960s English-language films
Columbia Pictures films
Beach party films
1960s American films